Laurent DeGive (January 1828 in Belgium – March 17, 1910 in Rockledge, FL) was the Belgian consul in Atlanta, Georgia in the late 19th century. He arrived in Atlanta in 1859. He built two opera houses in Atlanta, DeGive's Opera House (Bijou Theater), and DeGive's Grand Opera House, which would later become Loew's Grand Theatre, where Gone with the Wind premiered.

DeGive helped organize the Gate City Street Railroad Company in 1881 together with L. B. Wilson, A. M. Reinhardt and John Stephens. In 1884 they built a line which started at the Kimball House and went via Pryor, Wheat and Jackson Streets to Ponce de Leon Springs. The line operated until January 1887, when it was sold.

DeGive is buried at Westview Cemetery in Atlanta, GA.

See also

 DeGive's Opera House
 DeGive's Grand Opera House

External links
 Rita McInerney "DeGive Family Colorful In City, Catholic History", Georgia Bulletin, May 20, 1993

References

People from Atlanta
Belgian emigrants to the United States
1828 births
1901 deaths